A lowrider or low rider is a customized car with a lowered body that emerged among Mexican American youth in the 1940s. Lowrider also refers to the driver of the car and their participation in lowrider car clubs, which remain a part of Chicano culture and have since expanded internationally. These customized vehicles are also artworks, generally being painted with intricate, colorful designs, unique aesthetic features, and rolling on wire-spoke wheels with whitewall tires.

Lowrider rims are generally smaller than the original wheels. They are often fitted with hydraulic systems that allow height adjustable suspension, allowing the car to be lowered or raised by switch. This was developed after lowriding was made illegal in California and was  targeted for tickets by police. Lowriding bans have been acknowledged as discriminatory toward Chicano culture and Latinos. State legislation urged their removal in 2022 and some local city councils have done so.

Origin and purpose
The lowrider car serves no practical purpose beyond that of a standard car. Lowrider car culture began in Los Angeles, California, in the mid-to-late 1940s and during the post-war prosperity of the 1950s. Initially, some Mexican-American youths lowered blocks, cut spring coils, z'ed the frames and dropped spindles. The aim of the lowriders is to cruise as slowly as possible, "Low and Slow" being their motto. By redesigning these cars in ways that go against their intended purposes and in painting their cars so that they reflect and hold meanings from Mexican-American culture, lowriders create cultural and political statements that go against the more prevalent Anglo culture.

Legal issues

The rise in popularity resulted in a backlash: the enactment of Section 24008 of the California Vehicle Code on January 1, 1958, which made it illegal to operate any car modified so that any part was lower than the bottoms of its wheel rims. In 1959, mechanic Ron Aguirre found a way to bypass the law by installing hydraulics that could raise and lower a General Motors X-frame chassis by flipping a switch.

Lowriding became popular in the 1980s and 1990s, and  bans were enacted in many California cities. It regained popularity a little in 2009, then significantly during the COVID-19 pandemic in the United States. In the 2020s, activists argued that the practice was harmless and banning it was simply the result of prejudice against Mexican-Americans. San Jose and Sacramento repealed their bans in 2022 that had been enacted in 1986 and 1988, respectively. In 2022, the State Assembly unanimously passed a resolution urging all remaining cities with bans (including National City, which banned it in 1992) to repeal them.

Adding height adjustable suspension

In 1959, a customizer named Ron Aguirre developed a way of bypassing the law with the use of hydraulic Pesco pumps and valves that allowed him to change ride height at the flick of a switch. Ron Aguirre developed this modification with help from his father, after conceiving of the idea. Aguirre's motivation was to stop being targeted with traffic tickets, as he had been by local police in his city of Rialto, California after the statewide ban was enacted.

Role of the Chevrolet Impala
1958 saw the emergence of the Chevrolet Impala, which featured an X-shaped frame that was perfectly suited for lowering and modification with hydraulics. The standard perimeter-type frame was abandoned, replaced by a unit with rails laid out in the form of an elongated "X." Chevrolet claimed that the new frame offered increased torsional rigidity and allowed for a lower placement of the passenger compartment. This was a transitional step between traditional perimeter frame construction and the later fully unitized body/chassis, the body structure was strengthened in the rocker panels and firewall. This frame was not as effective in protecting the interior structure in a side impact crash, as a traditional perimeter frame.

Lowrider culture

Between 1960 and 1975, customizers adapted and refined GM X-frames, hydraulics, and airbrushing techniques to create the modern lowrider style. Lowriding grew alongside the Chicano Movement in the 1960s and 1970s.

At first, lowriders were only seen in places such as Los Angeles, especially in the 1970s on Whittier Boulevard when lowriding came to its peak. Whittier was a wide commercial street that cut through the barrio of the city in Los Angeles, California. Throughout the 1970s that culture spread throughout the Central Valley and San Jose areas of California, helped by release of the R&B song “Low Rider” by War, and creation of low riding clubs such as Carnales Unidos in 1975, and further expanded with the publishing of Low Rider magazine by San Jose State students in 1977. At its peak in 1988, Low Rider magazine had monthly sales of over 60,000 copies. Lowriders were featured in the 1979 film Boulevard Nights, which some blamed for associating lowrider culture with street gangs.
The lowriding scene is diverse with many different participating cultures, vehicle makes, and visual styles. The city of Española, New Mexico became a hotspot for lowriders outside of California.

Japan
Lowriding culture has also spread to Japan.

Junichi Shimodaira continues to import and sell these cars through his business, Paradise Road. The spread of lowrider culture and the fame of Paradise Road even attracted the attention of Ed Roth, who is famous for creating custom cars such as hot rods and a prominent figure in Kustom Kulture. Since the introduction of lowriders in Japan and the rise of lowriders in Japan in 2001, it is estimated that there are still 200 car clubs that are related to the lowrider scene that are still active to this day.

In popular culture 
In the 1990s, low riders became strongly associated with West Coast Hip hop and G-Funk culture. Mack 10, Dr. Dre, Snoop Dogg, Game, Warren G, South Central Cartel, Eazy-E, Above the Law and John Cena (In a music video of "Right Now") among others featured low riders prominently in their music videos.

See also

 Lowrider bicycle
 Chicano Rap
 Gangsta Rap which includes the track: Ridin' Low
 G funk
 Kid Frost

References

Further reading 

Brown, J (2002). "DIPN The Industry of Low Riding", Dream Factory Films, 1(2)(3).

External links
Lowriders, NMAAHC
Lowrider: DIY car magazine that became voice of Mexican-American resistance, The Guardian

Modified vehicles
Mexican-American culture
Kustom Kulture
Automotive styling features
Visual arts media
Subcultures